Charles Lewis Reynolds (born 18 March 1943) is a British sailor who competed in the 1968 Summer Olympics and in the 1972 Summer Olympics.

References

1943 births
Living people
British male sailors (sport)
Olympic sailors of Great Britain
Sailors at the 1968 Summer Olympics – Dragon
Sailors at the 1972 Summer Olympics – Soling